José León or José de León may refer to the following people:

In arts and entertainment
José León Sánchez (1929–2022), Costa Rican novelist
Joey de Leon (born 1946), born José María Ramos de León Jr., Filipino comedian and actor

In government and politics
José de León y Echales (died 1699), Spanish governor of Trinidad
José León Sandoval (fl 1845-1847), Nicaraguan president
José María León Jiménez (1893-1936), Spanish politician
José Antonio León Mendivil (born 1946), Mexican politician
José Gaudencio León Castañeda (born 1960), Mexican politician
Jose Luis León Perea (born 1970), Mexican politician

Sportspeople
José León Gómez (Pepe León, born 1935), Spanish former football club chairman
José Vicente León (born 1943), Spanish swimmer
José DeLeón (born 1960), Dominican baseball pitcher
José León (baseball) (born 1976), Puerto Rican baseball third baseman
José De León (born 1992), Puerto Rican baseball pitcher
José León (footballer) (born 1995), Spanish footballer

Other people
José de León Toral (1900-1929), Roman Catholic extremist
José León Asensio (born 1934), Dominican businessman
José León de Carranza Bridge, Spanish steel bridge in Cádiz